DAV Public School, Unit-8, Bhubaneswar is a co-educational school in Bhubaneswar, Odisha, India. It is part of the Dayanand Anglo-Vedic Schools System and the DAV College Trust and Management Society, New Delhi.
It has more than 3500 students. The campus occupies 4.57 acres,  with an additional 4.25 acres of playgrounds.

References 

Schools affiliated with the Arya Samaj

External links 

 

Schools in Bhubaneswar
1971 establishments in Orissa
Educational institutions established in 1971